Treimanis (feminine: Treimane) is a Latvian masculine surname, derived from the German language surname "Treimann". Individuals with the surname include:

Andris Treimanis (born 1985), Latvian football referee
Edžus Treimanis (born 1988), Latvian BMX racer

Latvian-language masculine surnames